Narcaeus is a genus of spiders in the family Thomisidae. It was first described in 1890 by Tamerlan Thorell. , it contains only one species, Narcaeus picinus, found on Java.

References

Thomisidae
Monotypic Thomisidae genera
Spiders of Asia
Taxa named by Tamerlan Thorell